Sebastapistes ballieui, the spotfin scorpionfish, is a species of venomous marine ray-finned fish belonging to the family Scorpaenidae, the scorpionfishes. This species is found in the Eastern Central Pacific including Hawaii.

Etymology
The fish is named in honor of Pierre Étienne Théodore Ballieu (1828–1885), the French consul to the Sandwich Islands (Hawai‘i). it was he who provided the Muséum national d’Histoire naturelle (Paris) with many Hawaiian specimens, including the type specimen of this one.

Size

References

ballieui
Taxa named by Henri Émile Sauvage
Fish described in 1875